Crenicichla minuano is a species of cichlid native to South America. It is found in the Uruguay River drainage, in tributaries of the middle an upper Uruguay River.

References

minuano

Taxa named by Carlos Alberto Santos de Lucena
Taxa named by Sven O. Kullander
Fish described in 1992